Alphons Joseph Kannanthanam or K. J. Alphons  (born 8 August 1953) is an Indian civil servant, advocate, and politician from Kerala. He is the former Union Minister of State for  Culture, and Tourism, in office since 3 September 2017 to May 2019 under the B.J.P. Government of Narendra Modi, MP.

He is the second BJP Central Minister from Kerala after O. Rajagopal. Alphons Kannanthanam belongs to the 1979 batch of the Indian Administrative Service (I.A.S.), Kerala cadre. He served as Commissioner of the Delhi Development Authority.

Alphons was born in Manimala, Kottayam district, Kerala, India, and was a Left Democratic Front supported independent Member of the Legislative Assembly for Kanjirappally constituency in Kottayam district, Kerala from 2006 to 2011. He joined the Bharatiya Janata Party in 2011. He is also the first ever BJP Central Minister from Pathanamthitta (Lok Sabha constituency).

Early life and education
Alphons was born in Manimala, Kottayam District, to K. V Joseph & Brijith Joseph. His father was a World War II veteran who became a school teacher after the war. His parents had nine children; they adopted two more from the orphanage.

Alphons received his early education in Malayalam medium village schools near his place of birth. He passed SSLC with 42% marks. He completed his Master's in Economics and was one of the toppers of the Civil Services Examination in the year 1979. He also completed his LLB while he was the Commissioner for Delhi Development Authority DDA.

Career 
Alphons was recruited to the Indian Administrative Service in 1979 and served for 27 years. He resigned from the service in 2006 to enter politics. He was later elected a Member of the Legislative Assembly, from Kanjirappally in Kottayam District, Kerala with the support of Left Democratic Front. He is also a practicing advocate in the High Court of Kerała at Kochi and the Supreme Court of India.

His national profile rose as the Commissioner of the Delhi Development Authority, he commissioned  demolition of 14,310 illegal buildings and reclaimed land worth more than Rs. 10,000 crores. These actions earned him the epithet 'The Demolition Man'.

In 2006, he resigned from the IAS to pursue a career in politics. He became a Left Democratic Front supported independent Member of the Legislative Assembly from Kanjirappally.

On 24 March 2011, Alphons joined the BJP in the presence of erstwhile party president Nitin Gadkari, after having resigned from his assembly seat a couple of hours prior.

He has been appointed a Member of Committee constituted by Government of India on 26 June 2017 to prepare the final draft of National Education Policy.

In a cabinet reshuffle on 3 September 2017, he was appointed minister of state in the Ministry of Electronics and Information Technology and minister of State (independent charge) of the Ministry of Tourism. On 9 November 2017, Alphons was elected unopposed as Rajya Sabha member from Rajasthan.

2019 Indian general election

Alphons Kannanthanam contested as NDA candidate from Ernakulam constituency for 2019 Indian general election and came third.

References

External links

1953 births
Living people
Indian Christians
North-Eastern Hill University alumni
Malayali politicians
Politicians from Kottayam
Independent politicians in India
Kerala MLAs 2006–2011
Bharatiya Janata Party politicians from Kerala
Narendra Modi ministry
Rajya Sabha members from Rajasthan
Indian Administrative Service officers
District magistrate